The 1981 European Athletics Junior Championships was the sixth edition of the biennial athletics competition for European athletes aged under twenty. It was held in Utrecht, Netherlands between 20 and 23 August.

Men's results

Women's results

Medal table

References

Results
European Junior Championships 1981. World Junior Athletics History. Retrieved on 2013-05-27.

European Athletics U20 Championships
European Junior
International athletics competitions hosted by the Netherlands
1981 in Dutch sport
1981 in youth sport
August 1981 sports events in Europe
Sports competitions in Utrecht (city)